Carl Jakob Sundevall (22 October 1801, Högestad – 2 February 1875) was a Swedish zoologist.
Sundevall studied at Lund University, where he became a Ph.D. in 1823. After traveling to East Asia, he studied medicine, graduating as Doctor of Medicine in 1830.

He was employed at the Swedish Museum of Natural History, Stockholm from 1833, and was professor and keeper of the vertebrate section from 1839 to 1871. He wrote Svenska Foglarna (1856–87) which described 238 species of birds observed in Sweden. He classified a number of birds collected in southern Africa by Johan August Wahlberg. In 1835, he developed a phylogeny for the birds based on the muscles of the hip and leg that contributed to later work by Thomas Huxley.  He then went on to examine the arrangement of the deep plantar tendons in the bird's foot. This latter information is still used by avian taxonomists. Sundevall was also an entomologist and arachnologist, for which (for the latter field) in 1833 he published an early catalog Conspectus Arachnidum. Much later in 1862, he wrote a monograph proposing a universal phonetic alphabet, Om phonetiska bokstäver.

Legacy
Sundevall is commemorated in the scientific names of four species of reptiles: Elapsoidea sundevalli, Leptotyphlops sundewalli, Mochlus sundevallii, and Prosymna sundevalli. Also the rodent, Sundevall's jird (Meriones crassus) is named after him.

References

Sources
Anonymous (1875). [Sundevall, C. J.] Journ. Ornith. 23: 214–215.   
Anonymous (1875). [Sundevall, C. J.]  J. Zool. 4: 61.   
Areschoug, J. E. (1879).  Minnesteckning öfver C. J. Sundevall. Stockholm.      
Bonnet, P. (1945). Bibliographia Araneorum. Toulouse.

External links
 Ibis: Obituary of Carl Jakob Sundevall

Swedish taxonomists
1801 births
1875 deaths
Swedish entomologists
Swedish mammalogists 
Swedish ornithologists
Swedish arachnologists
Members of the Royal Swedish Academy of Sciences
19th-century Swedish zoologists
Members of the Royal Society of Sciences in Uppsala